The ImaginAsian was a movie theater in midtown Manhattan, New York City, dedicated to exclusively showcasing Asian and Asian American films.  Located on 59th Street between 2nd and 3rd Avenues, The ImaginAsian was owned by ImaginAsian Entertainment, which also operates ImaginAsian TV (a 24/7 cable network), ImaginAsian Radio, and iaLink, an online e-zine.  All films shown at The ImaginAsian are in their original language and subtitled for English-speaking audiences.

The ImaginAsian primarily showcases Asian films, including films from Japan, China, India, Thailand, Vietnam, Korea and the Philippines, as well as Asian American films from the United States.  New box-office hits and independent films are shown alongside lesser-known classic titles.  It also hosts several film festivals, including the New York Asian Film Festival and the New York Filipino Film Festival.

The ImaginAsian was housed in a completely renovated Clearview Cinemas location, which was formerly known as the DW Griffith Theater. The theatre was acquired by Phoenix Cinemas, until they closed the location in 2014.

External links
Official Website

ImaginAsian
Midtown Manhattan
Asian-American culture in New York City